Erne Gaels, Belleek is a Gaelic Athletic Association club based in Belleek, County Fermanagh, Northern Ireland.

History
The club was founded in 1961. Erne Gaels won their first Fermanagh Senior Football Championship title in 1979, and followed this up by winning it again in 1981.

The Belleek club's most recent appearance in a senior final came in 2016, losing to Derrygonnelly Harps by a single point. Their most recent championship success was in the Intermediate grade, beating Devenish in the 2021 final. In their first year back up at senior, Erne Gaels reached the county final, but suffered a heavy defeat to Enniskillen Gaels.

Notable players
 Raymond Gallagher
 Rory Gallagher

Honours
 Fermanagh Senior Football Championship (2): 1979, 1981
 Fermanagh Intermediate Football Championship (2): 2008, 2021
 Fermanagh Junior Football Championship (1): 1963
 Fermanagh Senior Hurling Championship (5): 1973, 1974, 1975, 1981, 1984

References

Gaelic football clubs in County Fermanagh
Gaelic games clubs in County Fermanagh